John Balaban may refer to:
 John Balaban (poet) (born 1943), American poet and translator
 John Balaban (serial killer) (1924–1953), Romanian serial killer